Ripon Community Hospital is a health facility in Firby Lane, Ripon, North Yorkshire, England. It is managed by Harrogate and District NHS Foundation Trust. It is a Grade II listed building.

History
The hospital was established as the Ripon Dispensary in 1850. It was subsequently converted into a hospital; a nurses' home, built to commemorate the golden wedding anniversary of the Marquess and Marchioness of Ripon, was completed in 1901. A new wing was opened by Princess Mary in 1926 and the hospital joined the National Health Service in 1948.

References

Hospitals established in 1850
1850 establishments in England
Hospital buildings completed in 1850
Hospitals in North Yorkshire
NHS hospitals in England
Ripon